This was the second season of Barnes Football Club.  The early part of the season included two defeats against Forest FC (later renamed Wanderers FC), the second of them a bad-tempered affair in which the rules of the game became an object of contention.  On 19 December, Barnes played neighbouring Richmond FC in the first ever match under the newly-published laws of the Football Association; this 15-a-side clash ended in a goalless draw.

Notes

Barnes F.C. seasons
Barnes